John Clifford Wallace (born December 11, 1928) is a Senior United States circuit judge of the United States Court of Appeals for the Ninth Circuit and previously was a United States district judge of the United States District Court for the Southern District of California.

Education and career
Born in San Diego, California, Wallace received a Bachelor of Arts degree from San Diego State University in 1952, and a Bachelor of Laws from UC Berkeley School of Law in 1955. He served in the United States Navy as a Second Class Petty Officer from 1946 to 1949. He was in private practice in San Diego from 1955 to 1970, at the law firm of Gray Cary Ames & Frye.

Federal judicial service
Wallace was nominated by President Richard Nixon on October 7, 1970, to the United States District Court for the Southern District of California, to a new seat authorized by 84 Stat. 294. He was confirmed by the United States Senate on October 13, 1970, and received his commission on October 16, 1970. His service terminated on July 14, 1972, due to his elevation to the Ninth Circuit.

Wallace was nominated by President Nixon on May 22, 1972, to a seat on the United States Court of Appeals for the Ninth Circuit vacated by James Marshall Carter. He was confirmed by the Senate on June 28, 1972, and received his commission on June 28, 1972. Wallace served as Chief Judge of the Ninth Circuit from 1991 to 1996. He assumed senior status on April 8, 1996. As a senior judge, Wallace has a reduced caseload, but he continues to hear cases in the Ninth Circuit, and he sits by designation from time to time as a visiting judge on other federal appellate courts.

When Potter Stewart announced he was stepping down from the Supreme Court in June 1981, Wallace was initially believed to be the favorite for Stewart's seat, but he lost out to Sandra Day O'Connor because Ronald Reagan had made a campaign promise to appoint the first woman to the Court. Wallace was apparently not considered for the next vacancy after the departure of Chief Justice Warren Burger five years later, but after the retirement of Lewis F. Powell Jr. in 1987 and the rejection of Robert Bork, Wallace reemerged as a possible high court nominee. Alongside Pasco Bowman II of the Eighth Circuit, however, Wallace was viewed by the Senate's Democratic majority as the most controversial amongst the thirteen or fourteen nominees proposed after Bork was rejected. Wallace's devout Mormon faith, strong support for the death penalty based upon the Bible, and belief that strict separation of church and state was not mandated by the Constitution were all viewed unfavourably by Republican officials aware of a requirement for Democratic support and consultation. Democrats themselves voiced strong objection to Wallace as an excessively ideological candidate akin to Bork, and he was further hindered by his 1984 ruling that rejected an appeal by female athletes to include longer-distance races for women in the Summer Olympics. Powell's seat ultimately went to Anthony Kennedy, who was then serving alongside Wallace on the Ninth Circuit.

On July 31, 2018, Wallace wrote an opinion ruling against the sheriff Joe Arpaio. He was joined by Judges Susan P. Graber and Marsha Berzon. On October 22, 2019, Wallace wrote a 2—1 opinion that prohibited religious exemptions for businesses that did not want to participate in the healthcare system due to support of contraceptives. Wallace was joined by Graber, over the dissent of Judge Andrew Kleinfeld.

See also
 List of United States federal judges by longevity of service

References

Sources
J. Clifford Wallace Papers, MSS 7730; 20th Century Western and Mormon Manuscripts; L. Tom Perry Special Collections, Harold B. Lee Library, Brigham Young University.
 

1928 births
Living people
20th-century American judges
Judges of the United States Court of Appeals for the Ninth Circuit
Judges of the United States District Court for the Southern District of California
San Diego State University alumni
UC Berkeley School of Law alumni
United States court of appeals judges appointed by Richard Nixon
United States district court judges appointed by Richard Nixon
United States Navy sailors